Jacob Araptany (born 11 February 1994 in Kaproron, Kween District, Uganda) is an Ugandan runner. He competed in the 3000 m steeplechase at the 2012 and 2016 Olympics, reaching the final in 2016. He withdrew from the 1500 m event at the 2012 Olympics to focus on the 3000m steeplechase. He missed the 2014 Commonwealth Games because of injury.

References

1994 births
Living people
Ugandan male long-distance runners
Ugandan male steeplechase runners
People from Kween District
Olympic athletes of Uganda
Athletes (track and field) at the 2012 Summer Olympics
Athletes (track and field) at the 2016 Summer Olympics
World Athletics Championships athletes for Uganda
Ugandan male cross country runners
21st-century Ugandan people